The Goose Creek and China Jim Fire Complex were wildfires near the Nevada and Utah border by Montello, Nevada. As of August 4, 2018, the fires have burned a total of  acres and was 80% contained.

Closures 
State Route 30 was closed on the evening of Saturday, July 28, 2018.

Evacuations 
Grouse Creek was evacuated.

References 

2018 Nevada wildfires